State Route 41 (SR 41) is a north–south state highway in the southern and western portions of the U.S. state of Ohio.  Its southern terminus is at U.S. Route 52, US 62 Business, and US 68 Business in Aberdeen. (US 62 Bus. and US 68 Bus. continue south through Maysville, Kentucky crossing the Ohio River at the Simon Kenton Memorial Bridge from this point); and its northern terminus is along SR 48 at US 36 in Covington.  Throughout its southern portion the route is quite hilly as it passes predominantly northward through scenic areas with state parks and monuments.  Along its northern portion the route heads in a more westerly direction across mainly flat terrain as a major road through the cities of Washington Court House, Springfield, and Troy.

Route description
The portion of SR 41 between Covington and Washington Road, just outside Troy, is designated as the "Sheriff's Sgt. Robert "Bobby" Elliott Memorial Highway", in honor of a Miami County sheriff's sergeant who was shot and killed by a prisoner he was guarding on February 25, 1987.

History
1962 – Extended to Covington along the former State Route 70.
unknown – Extended to the Kentucky state line on the Ohio River along the previous alignment of the U.S. Route 62/U.S. Route 68 concurrency (signed as Business U.S. Route 62 in Kentucky; this extension would have occurred after the opening of the William H. Harsha Bridge in 2001). SR 41 has since been truncated back to US 52 and Market Place in Aberdeen.

On November 9, 2012, the Clark County-Springfield Transportation Coordinating Committee announced that a roundabout would be constructed at the intersection of SR 41 and SR 235 in Pike Township, which has been the site of numerous vehicle crashes, including five fatalities from 1992 to 2013. Construction on the $1.1 million project began in June 2014 and was completed the weekend before Monday, September 15. It is the first roundabout in Clark County and is believed to be the first in Ohio with all approaches at high speed, .

Major junctions

References

041
Transportation in Brown County, Ohio
Transportation in Adams County, Ohio
Transportation in Highland County, Ohio
Transportation in Pike County, Ohio
Transportation in Ross County, Ohio
Transportation in Fayette County, Ohio
Transportation in Madison County, Ohio
Transportation in Clark County, Ohio
Transportation in Miami County, Ohio